The Glazov State Pedagogical Institute named after  (ГГПИ) is an instite of higher pedagogical education in Glazov, Udmurt Republic, Russia.

History 
In 1939 in accordance with the Council of People's Commissars of Udmurt Autonomous Soviet Socialist Republic resolution, the Glazov Teacher's Institute was established. In 1946, it was named after famous Russian writer Vladimir Korolenko. In 1952, it was reorganized into the Glazov State Pedagogical Institute and included two faculties: Philology, and Physics and Mathematics. In 1956, the first graduation of teachers took place.

In 1998, the branch of the institute was founded in Izhevsk. In addition, there are offices in all pedagogical colleges of Udmurt Republic: in Mozhga (opened in 1999), Sarapul (1999), Igra (1999), Votkinsk (1999), Debyosy (2001), Uva (2002), Yar (2005), and Balezino (2006).

Education 
Nowadays, in the institute the education process is organized at four faculties:
 Faculty of Computer Science, Physics and Mathematics,
 Faculty of Social Communications and Philology,
 Faculty of Pedagogical and Art Education,
 Faculty of History and Linguistics.

References

Citations

Bibliography 
 Глазовский государственный педагогический институт // Удмуртская Республика : Энциклопедия [Udmurt Republic : Encyclopedia] / гл. ред. В. В. Туганаев. — 2-е изд., испр. и доп. — Ижевск : Издательство «Удмуртия», 2008. — С. 278. — 768 с. — 2200 экз. —

External links 
  

Universities in Volga Region
Glazov
Buildings and structures in Udmurtia
Teachers colleges in Russia
1952 establishments in Russia
Educational institutions established in 1952